Lai-ye Pasand (also Romanized as Lā’ī-ye Pāsand; also known as Pāsand) is a village in Zarem Rud Rural District, Hezarjarib District, Neka County, Mazandaran Province, Iran. At the 2006 census, its population was 196, in 47 families.

References 

Populated places in Neka County